Žďár is a municipality and village in Mladá Boleslav District in the Central Bohemian Region of the Czech Republic. It has about 1,500 inhabitants.

Administrative parts
Villages of Břehy, Doubrava, Příhrazy, Skokovy and Žehrov are administrative parts of Žďár.

Geography
It lies in the Jičín Uplands. Most of the municipal territory lies in the Bohemian Paradise Protected Landscape Area.

History
The first written mention of Žďár is from 1403. Until 1547, the village was owned by the Wartenberg family as part of the Rohozec estate.

Sights

The main landmark of Žďár is the Chapel of the Visitation of the Virgin Mary. It was built in the neo-Gothic style in 1903–1904.

A valuable house is the former smithery, which is a timbered building with a brick ground floor from the first half of the 18th century.

In the woods near Žehrov is a hunting lodge from 1820 called Belvín or Bellevue. It is inaccessible to the public.

References

External links

Villages in Mladá Boleslav District